The International School Ghent is an English-language international school that provides an international education to students aged 3 to 12.  The campus is shared with a local partner school De Kleine Icarus and lies in the heart of Ghent within the Flanders region of Belgium.  The school building is located inside the Leopoldskazerne, a military complex in the centre of Ghent.

History
The International School Ghent was established in 2011 and first opened its doors in September 2012 with six teachers.  The school was established to provide an international school education modeled on the International Primary Curriculum for children of expatriates, foreign employees in Belgium as well as Belgians who have an interest in providing international education to their children.

Education
Classes are taught in English and are currently offered in two streams:  Pre-primary education and Grades 1 to 6.   The school also provides Dutch language lessons and French language lessons for students beginning in grades 5 and 6.  The school has plans to add a middle school and high school program for Grades 7 to 12 in future years.

Partners
The International School Ghent reports to a Board of Directors which has representatives from its four founding member organisations:

 Barco N.V.
 Vlaams Instituut voor Biotechnologie (Flanders Institute for Biotechnology)
 Ghent University
 Volvo Cars (Volvo Cars Ghent)

The Board of Directors also has representatives from:

 City of Ghent
  VOKA

The International School Ghent also receives support from staff of its partner school De Kleine Icarus, from the Hogeschool Gent (University College Ghent)'s teacher training departments as well as from Deloitte and ING.

External links

 International School Ghent website

References 

Educational institutions established in 2011
International schools in Belgium
Secondary schools in Belgium
Education in Ghent
2011 establishments in Belgium